The Atlanta Capitals are an American Tier III ice hockey team in the North American 3 Hockey League's South Division. The team's home arena is the Atlanta IceForum in Duluth, Georgia.

History 
The franchise was initially established in 2013 as the Topeka Capitals and played two seasons out of the 7,777-seat Landon Arena.

Led by GM/head coach Anthony Bohn, the Capitals captured the South Division title in their first season. After three seasons with the Capitals Bohn would move on to the Aberdeen Wings (NAHL) as an assistant. In 2018 Bohn was named assistant coach of the Maine Mariners of the ECHL. In 2020 Bohn was named head coach of the Danbury Hat Tricks (FPHL), but the Hat Tricks sat out the season due to COVID-19 restrictions. Bohn moved back to the NAHL in 2021 as the first head coach of the new El Paso Rhinos.

With stalled negotiations for a lease renewal, team owner, Don Stone decided to move to the Atlanta, Georgia, metro area in 2015 to meet the league deadline for a confirmed facility. The team began playing out of the Center Ice Arena in Sandy Springs, Georgia.

In the 2018–19 season, the team played home games at the Atlanta IceForum in Duluth.

Season-by-season records

References

External links
Official website
NA3HL website

Sports teams in Atlanta
Ice hockey teams in Georgia (U.S. state)
2015 establishments in Georgia (U.S. state)
Ice hockey clubs established in 2015